Mount Kjerringa is an isolated peak,  above sea level, situated roughly  north of the Aker Peaks,  west of Magnet Bay, and  northeast of Mount Elkins in Enderby Land, East Antarctica.

Discovery and naming
Mount Kjerringa was mapped by Norwegian cartographers from aerial photographs taken by the Lars Christensen Expedition, 1936–37, and called Kjerringa (The Old Woman).

See also
 List of mountains of Enderby Land

References

External links
 Australian Antarctic Division
 Australian Antarctic Gazetteer
 Australian Antarctic Names and Medals Committee (AANMC)
 Scientific Committee on Antarctic Research (SCAR)
 PDF Map of the Australian Antarctic Territory
 Mawson Station
 ANARE Club
 Click here to see a satellite map of Mount Kjerringa at the United States Antarctic Resource Center's Atlas of Antarctic Research.

East Antarctica
Mountains of Enderby Land